Kymagnostus is a genus of trilobite in the order Agnostida, which existed in what is now Arkansas, United States. It was described by Hohensee in 1989, and the type species is Kymagnostus harti.

References

Agnostidae
Fossils of the United States